In mathematics, Hermite's identity, named after Charles Hermite, gives the value of a summation involving the floor function. It states that for every real number x and for every positive integer n the following identity holds:

Proof
Split  into its integer part and fractional part, . There is exactly one  with 

By subtracting the same integer  from inside the floor operations on the left and right sides of this inequality, it may be rewritten as

Therefore,

and multiplying both sides by  gives

Now if  the summation from Hermite's identity is split into two parts at index , it becomes

Alternate proof
Consider the function 

Then the identity is clearly equivalent to the statement  for all real . But then we find,

Where in the last equality we use the fact that  for all integers . But then  has period . It then suffices to prove that  for all . We deduce that the function is indeed 0 for all real inputs .

References

Mathematical identities
Articles containing proofs